The Walter Mars I was a nine-cylinder, air-cooled, radial engine for aircraft use built in Czechoslovakia in the late 1920s.

Design and development
The Mars I was the largest capacity design of a series of three similar radial engines developed by the Walter company. Common cylinders were used for the five-cylinder Walter Vega and the seven-cylinder Walter Venus, the Mars I being a nine-cylinder engine.

Applications

ANBO III
Breda Ba.15
DAR 4
DAR 6
Fizir FN
Focke-Wulf A 33
Letov Š-32
SET 10

Specifications

See also

References

Mars I
1920s aircraft piston engines
Aircraft air-cooled radial piston engines